(born October 23, 1927) is a Japanese actor and voice actor from Manchukuo. He is a drop-out of Kyoto University.

Filmography

Film

Yogiri yo Kon'yamo Arigatō (1967)
Zatoichi the Outlaw (1967)
The Snow Woman (1968)
The Sands of Kurobe (1968) as Senda
Apart from Life (1970)
Fuji sanchō (1970)
Battle of Okinawa (1971)
Submersion of Japan (1973)
Battles Without Honor and Humanity: Police Tactics (1974) as Chief editor
Karei-naru Ichizoku (1974) as Kuraishi
Prophecies of Nostradamus (1974) (Secretary of Environmental Agency)
Battles Without Honor and Humanity: Final Episode (1974) as Hirate
Cops vs. Thugs (1975)
The Bullet Train (1975)
Proof of the Man (1977) as Yamaji
Never Give up (1978) as Kuga
The Demon (1978) (Detective)
A Distant Cry from Spring (1980)
Samurai Reincarnation (1981) (Ogasawara Hidekiyo)
The Go Masters (1983)
The Return of Godzilla (1984) (Foreign Minister Emori)
Rock yo shizukani nagareyo (1988)
The Silk Road (1988) (Yeli Renrong)
Kabei: Our Mother (2008) (Hajime Nikaidō)
Patisserie Coin de rue (2011)
In His Chart 2 (2014)

Television drama
Shin Heike Monogatari (1972) as Fujiwara no Mitsuyori
Kunitori Monogatari (1973) as Nichiun
Ryōma ga Yuku (1982) (Iwakura Tomomi)
Minamoto no Yoshitsune (1990) (Hōjō Tokimasa)
Hachidai Shōgun Yoshimune (1995) (Hayashi Hōkō)
Kenpō wa Madaka (1996) (Shigeru Yoshida)
Tokugawa Yoshinobu (1998) (Tokugawa Ieyoshi)
Aoi (2000) as Itakura Katsushige
Fūrin Kazan (2007) as Uesugi Sadazane

Television animation
Sangojō Densetsu: Aoi Umeno Erufi (xxxx) (Nereus)

Theatrical animation
Akira (1988) (Doctor Ōnishi)
Penguin's Memory Shiawase Monogateri (xxxx) (Doctor Mō)

Dubbing roles

Live action
12 Angry Men (Juror #4 (E. G. Marshall))
The Adventures of Sherlock Holmes (Prime Minister Belinger (Harry Andrews))
Ben-Hur (1981 TV Asahi edition) (Quintus Arrius (Jack Hawkins))
The Bridge on the River Kwai (1976 Fuji TV edition) (Colonel Saito (Sessue Hayakawa))
Cold Sweat (1979 NTV edition) (Captain Ross (James Mason))
Columbo: Mind over Mayhem (Doctor Marshall Cahill (José Ferrer))
Cross of Iron (Colonel Brandt (James Mason))
The Diary of Anne Frank (Otto Frank (Joseph Schildkraut))
The Exorcist III (Video edition) (William F. Kinderman (George C. Scott))
Field of Dreams (Archibald "Moonlight" Graham (Burt Lancaster))
The Freshman (Carmine Sabatin (Marlon Brando))
Gladiator (2003 TV Asahi edition) (Marcus Aurelius (Richard Harris))
Go Tell the Spartans (Major Asa Barker (Burt Lancaster))
The Godfather (1976 NTV edition) (Vito Corleone (Marlon Brando))
Lawrence of Arabia (1981 TV Asahi edition) (Edmund Allenby, 1st Viscount Allenby (Jack Hawkins))
Lethal Weapon 2 (1993 TV Asahi edition) (Arjen Rudd (Joss Ackland))
Miracle on 34th Street (Kris Kringle (Richard Attenborough))
The Spy Who Loved Me (1983 TBS edition) (Stromberg (Curd Jürgens))
Star Wars Episode IV: A New Hope (1983 NTV edition) (Darth Vader)
The Empire Strikes Back (1980 Movie theater edition) (The Emperor)
The Empire Strikes Back (1986 NTV edition) (Darth Vader)
Return of the Jedi (1988 NTV edition) (Darth Vader)

Animation
Beauty and the Beast (Narrator)
The Transformers: The Movie (Unicron)

References

External links

Suzuki, Mizuho
Suzuki, Mizuho
Suzuki, Mizuho